U.S. Route 165 is a north–south United States highway spur of U.S. Highway 65.  It currently runs for 412 miles (663 km) from U.S. Route 90 in Iowa, Louisiana north to U.S. Highway 70 in North Little Rock, Arkansas. The route passes through the states of Arkansas and Louisiana.  It passes through the cities of Monroe and Alexandria in Louisiana. A segment of US 165 serves as a routing of the Great River Road within Arkansas.

Route description

|-
|U.S. Route 165 in Louisiana|LA
|229
|369
|-
|U.S. Route 165 in Arkansas|AR
|183
|295
|-
|Total
|412
|663
|}

Louisiana

From its southern terminus in Iowa at US 90 (near Lake Charles), US 165 follows a diagonal north south route, passing through the casino town of Kinder, where it intersects US 190.
Just south of Alexandria it merges with US 71 and they join through the west side of the city, across the Red River and into Pineville.  A new four-lane (two lanes in each direction) bridge is being built beside the aging OK Allen Bridge (appropriately named the Fort Buhlow Bridge) and should be open in mid-2013.  At that time US 165 will be completely four-laned for most of its traverse of Louisiana. There the two highways meet US 167 and 71 parts with 165. Going on through the Kisatchie National Forest the rest of the highway to Monroe is forest land, farmland, and small towns. Crossing I-20 in Monroe, the highway's largest city, it proceeds to Bastrop and crosses the Arkansas line a few miles north of the town. Due to the Louisiana DOT TIMED Project, US 165 is now a four lane divided highway from Iowa to Bastrop.
US 165 passes near three federal prisons: USP Oakdale and two near Pollock.  Also, near Oakdale is the ruins of Camp Claiborne, an abandoned WWII military post.

Arkansas

The route enters Arkansas south of Wilmot in Ashley County, Arkansas. US 165 passes through bayous and marshlands before it intersects Highway 52 and Highway 173 in the town. Further north in Parkdale the route intersects Highway 8 and Highway 209. In Portland, US 165 intersects Highway 160 before entering Montrose. In the south part of Montrose US 165 passes under U.S. Route 82, intersecting US 82 Business (US 82B) downtown. US 165 continues north near Cut-off Creek Wildlife Management Area to enter Drew County. Only serving the extreme southeast corner of the county, US 165 runs through Jerome near the Jerome Elementary School No. 22. The highway enters Chicot County near Dermott where it intersects Highway 208 and Highway 35. Northeast of town the route intersects its parent route (US 65) which form a concurrency to Dumas.

The route breaks from US 65 at Pickens Street, with Highway 277 shooting from the route east of Cypress Creek. The route forms a concurrency north with Highway 1 for  beginning at Back Gate. US 165/AR 1 intersect Highway 212 before crossing the Arkansas River on the Pendleton Bridge.

Upon entering Arkansas County the route passes the A.M. Bohnert Rice Plantation Pump#2 Engine and through sectioned farmland before meeting US 165B in Gillett. US 165/AR 1 continue north to De Witt, with AR 1 breaking east and US 165 turning due west. The route has a junction with Highway 11 at Eldridge Corner after which US 165 turns due north. This segment of US 165 was formerly AR 11 and is preserved in part by the National Register of Historic Places as Old AR 11 – Kauffman Road. The route enters Stuttgart after an intersection with 22nd Street. US 165 skirts the eastern edge of the city as Park Avenue before it turns west to intersect US 63 and enter Prairie County. The route only has one junction in its  within the county, Highway 343.

The route next enters Lonoke County. Now within the Little Rock metro area, the route serves the southern part of the county with many rural junctions. Along its path, the route runs west through Humnoke, Allport, Coy (all with populations under 300 as of 2010) while intersecting Highway 13 and Highway 31 prior to England. US 165 turns northeast in England after a junction with Highway 256. US 165 passes through the Keo Commercial Historic District in Keo and later the Toltec Mounds Archeological State Park before entering Pulaski County.

Entering North Little Rock, the route has a junction with I-440 before terminating at Broadway Street (US 70).

Great River Road

The Great River Road is designated as a National Scenic Byway in the state of Arkansas. Established in 1938, the route is actually a series of roads which connect Canada and the Gulf of Mexico along the Mississippi River. The portion of US 165 from the beginning of its concurrency with US 65 near Dermott north to De Witt is part of the Great River Road in Arkansas. The designation follows AR 1 north from De Witt and US 65 south of Dermott.

History
US 165 was established in 1926 on a route extending from Iowa, Louisiana to McGehee, Arkansas. A proposed extension north to Corning, Arkansas in 1946 was deferred. The route was extended to its current North Little Rock terminus in 1982.

The Louisiana portion was generally aligned with the existing State Route 24 south of Alexandria and State Route 14 north of Alexandria.  Both had been designated in 1921 and remained co-signed with US 165 until the 1955 Louisiana Highway renumbering.

US 165 replaced Arkansas Highway 11 in much of Arkansas County, Arkansas. Highway 11 was the main route through the area since its designation in the original 1926 state highway system. Some of this original pavement has been preserved by the National Register of Historic Places as Old AR 11 – Kauffman Road.

Major intersections

Special routes

Alexandria business route

U.S. Highway 165 Business (officially U.S. Highway 165-Z) is a business route of U.S. Highway 165 in and near Alexandria, Louisiana, United States. It once ran along Masonic Drive in Alexandria, but has since been truncated by other routes. It currently begins at an intersection with US 71/US 165, running concurrently with LA 1. LA 1/US 165 BUS meet, and run concurrently with, LA 28 BUS before LA 1/LA 28 split from US 165 BUS.

US 165 Business then travels along Jackson Street, which is the same as its former alignment. It then crosses the Red River along the Gillis Long Bridge before meeting LA 3100. US 165 Business travels north while meeting LA 180, a former segment of the Jefferson Highway auto trail, and crossing the Pineville Expressway before ending at an intersection with its parent route.

Alexandria bypass route

US 165 Bypass was the original designation for the current route of US 165 through Alexandria and Pineville. Until 1961, when it was moved to the bypass, US 165 was routed along the current business route.

Monroe business route

Business US 165 starts a few miles south of Monroe and also becomes Jackson and Ouachita streets, going through downtown Monroe and passing by Saint Francis Medical Center and the Monroe Civic Center. It follows US 80 at Louisville Avenue, and is signed along Louisville Avenue to its terminus at US 165 (Sterlington Hwy).

Major intersections

Gillett business route

U.S. Route 165 Business is a business route in Gillett. The route serves mostly as Front Street and passes near the Old Gillett Jail on the National Register of Historic Places.

Major intersections

See also
 List of U.S. Routes
 List of U.S. Routes in Arkansas
 U.S. Route 65

References

External links

 Endpoints of U.S. Highway 165
 Pendleton Bridge – carries US 165/AR 1 over Arkansas River

65-1
65-1
65-1
165
1
Transportation in Calcasieu Parish, Louisiana
Transportation in Jefferson Davis Parish, Louisiana
Transportation in Allen Parish, Louisiana
Transportation in Rapides Parish, Louisiana
Transportation in Grant Parish, Louisiana
Transportation in LaSalle Parish, Louisiana
Transportation in Caldwell Parish, Louisiana
Transportation in Ouachita Parish, Louisiana
Transportation in Morehouse Parish, Louisiana
Transportation in Ashley County, Arkansas
Transportation in Drew County, Arkansas
Transportation in Chicot County, Arkansas
Transportation in Desha County, Arkansas
Transportation in Arkansas County, Arkansas
Transportation in Prairie County, Arkansas
Transportation in Lonoke County, Arkansas
Transportation in Pulaski County, Arkansas